Sextus Julius Caesar may refer to:

 Sextus Julius Caesar (praetor 208 BC)
 Sextus Julius Caesar (consul 157 BC)
 Sextus Julius Caesar (consul 91 BC)
 Sextus Julius Caesar (governor of Syria)

See also
 Julii Caesares
 Sextus Julius